This article documents suicide in Saudi Arabia. 

As of 2016, the country had a suicide rate of 3.4 per 100,000 people, ranked 163rd in the world. However, due to the laws against suicide, the data may be under reported.

Legislation 
Suicide is a crime in Saudi Arabia.

By group

Women 
Discrimination, severe social restrictions, and forced marriages are motivators for women's suicides.

Migrants 
In a study conducted in the Dammam region, the suicide rate was found to be disproportionately higher for migrants.

References 

Saudi Arabia